The Church of Jesus Christ of Latter-day Saints in Haiti refers to the Church of Jesus Christ of Latter-day Saints (LDS Church) and its members in Haiti. The first branch (small congregation) was formed in 1980. As of December 31, 2021, there were 24,911 members in 48 congregations in Haiti.

History

The first member of the church in Haiti, Alexandre Mourra, a storekeeper, wrote a letter to Richard L. Millett, president of the church's Florida Ft. Lauderdale Mission, requesting a copy of the Book of Mormon after he read a pamphlet about Joseph Smith. After reading the book, Mourrga traveled to Florida and was baptized on June 30, 1977. He then shared his findings on the church and on July 2, 1978, Millett and his counselors traveled to Haiti to preside over the baptism of 22 Haitians near Port-au-Prince. The first four full-time missionaries were transferred from the Paris France Mission and to Haiti in May 1980. The first branch was established that October, with Mourra as president. On December 19, 1982 the Haiti District was created.

 
On November 29, 1983, selections from the Book of Mormon were published in Haitian Creole. In 1999, the complete translation of the Book of Mormon was published, followed by the translation into Haitain Creole of the Doctrine and Covenants and Pearl of Great Price being published in July 2007.

By 2001, all church congregations were led by local members rather than missionaries. At the church's April 2009 General Conference, Fouchard Pierre-Nau, a native of Jérémie, was called as an area seventy in the church's Fourth Quorum of the Seventy, the most prominent church position ever held by a Haitian up to that time.

Most of the church's buildings sustained little to no damage in the 2010 Haiti earthquake. Church buildings became temporary hospitals and shelters during the aftermath of the quake.  Several church members from Hati, the United States, and other nations assisted with the medical, cleanup, and rebuilding that occurred following the quake. The church also provided substantial relief in the aftermath of Hurricane Hanna and other tropical cyclones.

Stakes
The Port-au-Prince Haiti Stake, the first stake in Haiti, was organized on September 21, 1997, with Reynolds Antoine Saint-Louis as president. On September 7, 2003, the Port-au-Prince North Stake was organized. In September 2012, the third and fourth Haitian stakes were created in Carrefour and Croix-des-Missions.  A fifth, based in Petit-Goâve and named the Les Palmes Haiti Stake, was formed on September 9, 2018.

As of February 2023, Haiti had the following stakes and districts:

Missions
Haiti was part of the Florida Ft. Lauderdale Mission when the first convert inquired of the church in 1977. Missionary work opened for Haiti in 1980 and in 1982, there was 12 missionaries serving in Haiti from the West Indies Mission. The Pout-au-Prince Mission was organized on August 1, 1984. Following a military coup in October 1991, the church withdrew foreign missionaries from Haiti. Foreign missionaries returned in July 1999.
Haiti Port-au-Prince Mission

Temples

On September 17, 2000, the Santo Domingo Dominican Republic Temple was dedicated, making temple ordinances more accessible for Haitian members. The Port-au-Prince Haiti Temple was dedicated on September 1, 2019 by David A. Bednar.

See also

Religion in Haiti

References

External links
 History of the Church in Haiti David R. Crockett
 Alexandre Mourra - First member in Haiti Richard L. Millett
 Cuban and Haitian Saints in Florida Chip Southerland
 The Church of Jesus Christ of Latter-day Saints (Caribbean) - Official Site
 ComeUntoChrist.org Latter-day Saints Visitor site

Haiti
Church of Jesus Christ of Latter-day Saints